Molly Rapert Inhofe (born October 6, 1963) is an associate professor of marketing at the University of Arkansas Sam M. Walton College of Business. She is also the Director for the Center for Teaching Effectiveness. She is the daughter of Jim Inhofe, U.S. Senator from Oklahoma.

Education
Rapert graduated from the University of Arkansas with a BSBA and an MBA. She then went to the University of Memphis and earned a Ph.D. in Marketing.

Career
Rapert began her career at the university in 1991 as an assistant professor, becoming an associate professor in 1998. In 2010, she was named by the Marketing Management Association as the top marketing professor in the nation.

References

External links 
 

Living people
1963 births
People from Tulsa, Oklahoma
University of Arkansas alumni
University of Memphis alumni
University of Arkansas faculty
Marketing people
American marketing people
Marketing women